Thorsten Boer (born 12 August 1968 in Halle (Saale), East Germany) is a German football manager and former player. 

Boer joined the reserve team of BFC Dynamo in the second tier DDR-Liga in 1987. The reserve teams of the DDR-Oberliga clubs were not allowed to participate in the DDR-Liga after the  1988-89 season. Boer was then transferred to SG Dynamo Fürstenwalde. SG Dynamo Fürstenwalde was affiliated to BFC Dynamo at the time. Boer was then allowed to make his debut for BFC Dynamo in the first tier DDR-Oberliga in the 11th matchday of the 1989-90 DDR-Oberliga against 1. FC Lokomotive Leipzig on 18 November 1989. BFC Dynamo was renamed FC Berlin after the Peaceful revolution. Boer then played for FC Berlin in the 1990-91 NOFV-Oberliga. He then left FC Berlin for Chemnitzer FC in 1991.  Boer made a total of 85 2. Bundesliga appearances for Chemnitzer FC and Tennis Borussia Berlin in the early 1990s.

References

External links 
 

1968 births
Living people
Sportspeople from Halle (Saale)
People from Bezirk Halle
German footballers
East German footballers
Footballers from Saxony-Anhalt
Association football forwards
2. Bundesliga players
FSV Union Fürstenwalde players
Berliner FC Dynamo players
Chemnitzer FC players
Tennis Borussia Berlin players
1. FC Union Berlin players
German football managers
DDR-Oberliga players